"Like Nothing Ever Happened" is a song written by Kye Fleming and Dennis Morgan, and recorded by American country music artist Sylvia.  It was released in September 1982 as the third single from her album Just Sylvia.  The song reached #2 on the Billboard Hot Country Singles chart and #1 on the RPM Country Tracks chart in Canada.

Charts

Weekly charts

Year-end charts

References

1982 singles
1982 songs
Sylvia (singer) songs
Songs written by Kye Fleming
Songs written by Dennis Morgan (songwriter)
Song recordings produced by Tom Collins (record producer)
RCA Records singles